Framing Armageddon: Something Wicked Part 1 is the eighth studio album from Iced Earth, released on September 11, 2007. It is part one of two concept albums based on a trilogy of songs from Iced Earth's fifth studio album, Something Wicked This Way Comes. The saga, aptly titled the Something Wicked Saga, tells the fictional history of mankind, from its creation to its destruction. It is the second and final album with vocalist Tim "Ripper" Owens. This is also the first album that Schaffer become more involved in playing lead guitars parts.

Overview
Framing Armageddon is the band's first studio album featuring lead guitarist Troy Seele, and drummer Brent Smedley, who never played on an Iced Earth studio album during his previous stints with the group. Tim "Ripper" Owens makes his final appearance as lead singer on this record, as well. Also, this was bassist Dennis Hayes' first appearance on an Iced Earth album, though he only appears on two songs. Former Iced Earth lead guitarist Tim Mills is featured on "Reflections", and co-wrote both that song and "Infiltrate and Assimilate".

In December 2006, Jon Schaffer posted a journal announcing that Iced Earth's new album, then titled Something Wicked - Part 1, would be released in September/October 2007. The follow-up album, then titled Something Wicked - Part 2, would be released in January/February 2008. On March 17, Schaffer announced the final track list, and that the album would be renamed to Framing Armageddon (Something Wicked Part 1), with a new target release of August or September. On June 25, Schaffer uploaded the cover of the album on icedearth.com. Audio samples of all the tracks have been posted at spv.de, the official site of the band's record label.

A music video for "Ten Thousand Strong" was released, though lead guitarist Troy Seele was not yet with the band when it was filmed. The video features rotoscoping.

The Japanese release of Framing Armageddon features the album's single, "Overture of the Wicked," as a bonus disc.

Jon Schaffer had intended to release both of the Something Wicked albums in one boxed set, with Matt Barlow contributing the vocals on both albums for the sake of continuity, plus adding at least four songs to The Crucible of Man and remixing Framing Armageddon. However Matt Barlow once again left the band before these plans came to fruition.

Story 
Tim "Ripper" Owens talked about the story in an interview with Thrash Pit:

A few years later, Jon Schaffer further detailed the story in an interview:

Track listing

Personnel
Tim "Ripper" Owens – lead/backing vocals
Jon Schaffer – lead/rhythm/acoustic guitars; bass guitars; backing vocals
Brent Smedley – drums/backing vocals

Additional personnel
Troy Seele – guitar solos (tracks 5,6,10,12,14 and 17)
Dennis Hayes – bass guitars (7); fretless bass guitar (12)
Jim Morris – lead guitars (16); backing vocals
Tim Mills – clean guitars (7)
Howard Helm – keyboards; Hammond organ; backing vocals
Steve Rogowski – cello
Todd Plant – backing vocals
Patina Ripkey – backing vocals
Debbie Harrell – backing vocals
Kathy Helm – backing vocals
Jason Blackerby – backing vocals

References

2007 albums
Iced Earth albums
Concept albums
SPV/Steamhammer albums